John Martin (born 1948) is an English former professional rugby league footballer who played in the 1960s, 1970s and 1980s. He signed for his hometown club, Halifax, in 1967 as a nineteen-year-old from Siddal ARLFC, and played a total of 262 games until his transfer to Keighley in 1980.

Career highlights include winning the Halifax RLFC Player of the Year award in seasons 1974–75 and 1977–78, being awarded of the James Harrison Trophy (fairest and most loyal player in Yorkshire) in 1977.

Background
Martin was born in Halifax, West Riding of Yorkshire, England.

Playing career

Player's No.6 Trophy Final appearances
Martin played  in Halifax's 22-11 victory over Wakefield Trinity in the 1971–72 Player's No.6 Trophy Final during the 1971–72 season at Odsal Stadium, Bradford on Saturday 22 January 1972.

Testimonial match
Martin's Testimonial match at Halifax took place in 1978.

Honoured at Halifax RLFC
Martin is a Halifax RLFC Hall Of Fame Inductee, he was admitted to the Halifax R.L.F.C. Hall of Fame, alongside Karl Harrison in October 2010.

References

1948 births
Living people
English rugby league players
Halifax R.L.F.C. players
Keighley Cougars players
Rugby league locks
Rugby league props
Rugby league second-rows
Rugby league players from Halifax, West Yorkshire